Follow a Star is a 1959 British black and white comedy musical film directed by Robert Asher and starring Norman Wisdom.

Plot
Norman Truscott works as a dry cleaner, but dreams of being a stage performer. To this end, he takes elocution and singing lessons with Miss Dobson, so far with little success. He is also in love with Judy, Miss Dobson's colleague, who teaches piano.

Norman goes to the theatre to see singing star Vernon Carew and causes chaos when he tries to join in the performance. But Carew realises that Norman's untrained voice is better that his own voice, which is fading rapidly, as is his popularity. On the pretext of offering Norman singing lessons, he secretly records Norman singing in the bath, and passes the recordings off as his own - miming to the recording on television. They are a success and Carew is a star again.

Miss Dobson realises what's happened and smuggles herself and Norman backstage during Carew's performance. She sees the record being played with Carew miming to it. She exposes him as a fake, again causing chaos onstage and backstage. Norman is persuaded to sing on stage and is acclaimed by the audience. But whilst they applaud him, he slips quietly away with Judy.

Cast
Norman Wisdom as Norman Truscott 
June Laverick as Judy
Jerry Desmonde as Vernon Carew 
Hattie Jacques as Dymphna Dobson 
Richard Wattis as Dr. Chatterway 
Eddie Leslie as Harold Franklin 
John Le Mesurier as Birkett 
Sydney Tafler as Pendlebury 
Fenella Fielding as Lady Finchington
Charles Heslop as The General 
Joe Melia as Stage Manager 
Ron Moody as Violinist
Dick Emery as Party Drunk
Charles Gray as Party Guest
Dilys Laye as Girl in Park
Peggy Anne Clifford as Offended Lady at Party (uncredited)

Reception
The film was popular at the British box office.

References

External links

Follow a Star at BFI Screenonline
 

1959 films
1959 comedy films
British black-and-white films
British comedy films
Films directed by Robert Asher
Films shot at Pinewood Studios
1959 directorial debut films
1960s English-language films
1950s English-language films
1950s British films
1960s British films